Dendropsophus juliani is a species of frogs in the family Hylidae. It is endemic to northern Bolivia.

References

juliani
Amphibians of Bolivia
Frogs of South America
Amphibians described in 2006